Guangdong General Hospital ( meaning "Guangdong Provincial People's Hospital") is a large hospital, founded in 1946, located in Yuexiu District, Guangzhou, Guangdong, China.

References

External links
 Guangdong General Hospital
 Guangdong General Hospital 

Hospital buildings completed in 1946
Hospitals in Guangzhou
1946 establishments in China
Hospitals established in 1946
Yuexiu District